Grigori Fyodorovich Chernozubov (January 30, 1835 – ?) was an Imperial Russian brigade commander. He fought in the Crimean War and the Russo-Turkish War of 1877–1878. He was the father of Fyodor Chernozubov.

Awards
Order of Saint Anna, 3rd class, 1864
Order of Saint Anna, 2nd class, 1874
Order of Saint Vladimir, 4th class, 1877
Gold Sword for Bravery, 1878
Order of Saint Vladimir, 3rd class, 1878
Order of Saint Stanislaus (House of Romanov), 1st class, 1879
Order of Saint Anna, 1st class, 1879
Order of Saint Vladimir, 2nd class, 1884

Sources
Краткая биография Г. Ф. Чернозубова 
Список генералам по старшинству. Составлен по 1 сентября 1896 года. СПб., 1896

1835 births
People of the Crimean War
Russian military personnel of the Russo-Turkish War (1877–1878)
Recipients of the Order of St. Anna, 3rd class
Recipients of the Order of St. Anna, 2nd class
Recipients of the Order of St. Vladimir, 4th class
Recipients of the Gold Sword for Bravery
Recipients of the Order of St. Vladimir, 3rd class
Recipients of the Order of Saint Stanislaus (Russian), 1st class
Recipients of the Order of St. Anna, 1st class
Recipients of the Order of St. Vladimir, 2nd class
Year of death missing